Terry Lyons may refer to:

 Terry Lyons (footballer) (1929–1986), English footballer
 Terry Lyons (mathematician) (born 1953), British mathematician
 Terry Lyons (baseball) (1908–1959), Major League Baseball first baseman